Isidro Nozal Vega (born 18 October 1977) is a Spanish former professional road racing cyclist. Nozal was runner-up in the 2003 Vuelta a España and an instrumental domestique in Roberto Heras' 2004 Vuelta a España win.

Doping
In 2005, Vega was suspended for two weeks after being tested with a hematocrit level above 50 before the start of Dauphine Libere.  In 2006, he was initially implicated in the Operación Puerto doping case, but was cleared of any wrongdoing by Spanish officials. He later admitted his involvement, saying he did three blood transfusions with Fuentes in the season before the 2005 Dauphine Libere, but denying he doped.
For the 2008 and 2009 seasons Nozal rode for the Portuguese Pro Continental team of Liberty Seguros. In September 2009 Nozal and two teammates (Nuno Ribeiro and Héctor Guerra) were announced to have tested positive for EPO-CERA in samples taken for the previous month's Tour of Portugal. Liberty Seguros immediately announced that it would cease sponsorship of the team and its participation in cycling. Ribeiro's win was withdrawn and the second-placed rider, Spain's David Blanco, was elevated to the overall win. Nozal, Ribeiro, and Guerra all received two-year suspensions from cycling.

Career achievements

Major results

2001
 6th Overall Vuelta Ciclista a la Rioja
2002
 1st Stage 3 Clasica de Alcobendas
 1st Stage 3 Vuelta a Burgos
 4th Overall Vuelta a Castilla y León
 7th Overall Deutschland Tour
2003
 2nd Overall Vuelta a España
1st Stage 6 (ITT) & 13 (ITT)
Held  after Stages 4–19
 4th Time trial, UCI Road World Championships
 6th Overall Deutschland Tour
2004
 7th Overall Vuelta a España
 10th Subida al Naranco

Grand Tour general classification results timeline

DNF = did not finish

References

1977 births
Living people
Sportspeople from Barakaldo
Spanish male cyclists
Cyclists from Cantabria
Doping cases in cycling
Spanish sportspeople in doping cases
Spanish Vuelta a España stage winners
Cyclists from the Basque Country (autonomous community)
People from the Eastern Coast of Cantabria
20th-century Spanish people
21st-century Spanish people